Georgios Mavros (Kastellorizo, 15 March 1909 – Athens, 6 May 1995) was a Greek jurist and politician. He served in several ministerial posts, and was Minister for Foreign Affairs and Deputy Prime Minister in the 1974 national unity government following the restoration of democracy.

He taught law at the University of Athens from 1937 to 1942, and became a politician following the liberation of Greece from the Axis Occupation, being elected to the Hellenic Parliament from 1946 on. During the occupation he helped rescue Jews from the Holocaust. In 1994 he was awarded the title of Righteous Among the Nations by Yad Vashem.

He held cabinet posts as Justice Minister (1945), Minister for National Education (1946), Commerce and Industry (1949), Finance (1951), National Defence (1952) and Government Coordination (1963–1965).

He was governor of the National Bank of Greece, and in 1966 established the National Bank of Greece Cultural Foundation (MIET). After the Greek military junta of 1967–1974, as part of the Centre Union – New Forces he served as Minister for Foreign Affairs and Deputy Prime Minister of Greece under Prime Minister Konstantinos Karamanlis. Increasingly sidelined by Karamanlis' New Democracy, Mavros joined the Panhellenic Socialist Movement and was elected an MP with it in 1981, and an MEP in 1984.

References

External links
 

1909 births
1995 deaths
People from Kastellorizo
People from the Vilayet of the Archipelago
Liberal Party (Greece) politicians
Liberal Democratic Union (Greece) politicians
Centre Union politicians
Centre Union – New Forces politicians
Greek Righteous Among the Nations
Union of the Democratic Centre (Greece) politicians
PASOK politicians
Deputy Prime Ministers of Greece
Finance ministers of Greece
Foreign ministers of Greece
Ministers of National Defence of Greece
Greek MPs 1946–1950
Greek MPs 1950–1951
Greek MPs 1951–1952
Greek MPs 1956–1958
Greek MPs 1981–1985
PASOK MEPs
MEPs for Greece 1984–1989